Robert Haskins Miller (March 3, 1919 – September 10, 2009) was the Chief Justice of the Kansas Supreme Court from 1988 to 1990.

Born in Columbus, Ohio, Miller received his bachelor's degree from the University of Kansas and received his law degree from University of Kansas School of Law. After serving in the military during World War II, Miller served as Kansas county attorney and later was a Kansas district court judge and United States magistrate judge. In 1975, he was appointed to the Kansas Supreme Court, where he became chief justice. He died in Topeka, Kansas.

References

External links 

1919 births
2009 deaths
Politicians from Columbus, Ohio
University of Kansas alumni
Kansas state court judges
Chief Justices of the Kansas Supreme Court
20th-century American judges
American military personnel of World War II